Venkateswara Temple is a temple in Tirumala, Chittoor district, Andhra Pradesh.

Venkateswara Temple may also refer to:

India
 Venkateswara Temple, Dwaraka Tirumala, Andhra Pradesh, India
 Venkateswara Temple, Ramenahalli, a temple in Gadag district, Karnataka
 Venkateswara Temple, Tenali, a temple in Guntur district, Andhra Pradesh
 Venkateswara Temple, Eklaspur, a temple in Mahabubnagar district, Telangana

Other countries
Venkateswara Temple, Minnesota, a temple in Minnesota, United States
 Sri Venkateswara Temple, a temple in Helensburgh, New South wales, Australia